Rushall Olympic Football Club is an English football club based in Rushall, a former mining village now forming part of the northern suburbs of Walsall.

History

Early years
Although football had been played in the village for at least 20 years previously, the earliest known reference to Rushall Olympic Football Club is in local newspaper reports on matches from the 1893–94 season. The club joined the Cannock & District League in 1895, finishing as runners-up in their first season and later joined the Junior (where they were champions in 1903–04), Amateur, Parks and Senior sections of the Walsall & District League.

During the inter-war years, the team won a number of local honours. At this time, the team comprised mainly local colliery workers and played on a field behind the Miners Arms pub in Rushall and changed in the pub itself. However, some time prior to the Second World War, the club disbanded.

Post-Second World War

In 1951, a group of local young men decided to re-form the club. They approached the proprietor of a local fish and chip shop for permission to use his premises as their headquarters and secured the use of Rowley Place as a home ground. The club joined the Walsall & District Amateur League, where the team won the Second Division championship in 1952–53, and later the First Division championship in 1955–56, after which they gained promotion to the Staffordshire County League (South), where they won the Second Division title at the first attempt.

Following promotion to the First Division, the club won four championship titles between 1960 and 1965. In 1975, in a bid to gain a higher league status, the club decided to move three miles away to the Aston University Sports Ground, just off the main A34 Walsall to Birmingham road. Meanwhile, the club obtained the lease on some land in Daw End, Rushall, and the new Dales Lane ground was officially opened on 14 August 1977.

The club were accepted into the West Midlands (Regional) League in 1978, and won the First Division title in 1980. The club enjoyed 14 seasons of moderate success in the Premier Division, with a highest finish of fifth place achieved in 1988–89. In 1994, the "Pics" became founder members of the new Midland Football Alliance. Although the late 1990s brought only mid-table performances in the league, the Pics did defeat the then-Southern League club Rocester at the Bescot Stadium – home of Walsall – in a penalty shoot-out to lift the Walsall Senior Cup in 2000.

After finishing in second place in both 2000–01 and 2002–03, the Pics finally claimed the league title in 2004–05, and with it promotion to the Southern League Division One West. They were then transferred to the Southern League Division One Midlands for the 2006–07 season, where they stayed for two years, qualifying for the play-offs in their last season by finishing fifth.

Due to the restructuring of Northern Premier League Division One, they were transferred yet again to the NPL Division One South for the 2008–09 season, when they again finished fifth and qualified for the play-offs. They were also unsuccessful in achieving promotion this time. Manager Paul Holleran then left the club to be replaced by Neil Kitching, who started his first season brightly before tailing off to finish in mid-table; the team also reached the final of the Walsall Senior Cup under Kitching.

Despite further budget restriction, Kitching was supported by a relatively youthful backroom staff, including Nick Amos and Ian Cooper, and they went on to finish third in the 2010–11 season, before going on to reach the play-off final, after a 3–0 win over Brigg Town in the semi final. A 2–0 victory over Grantham Town in the final saw Rushall Olympic reach the Northern Premier League Premier Division, the first time the club had ever reached the seventh level of the English football league system.

The first season at this higher level saw Rushall Olympic finish eighth in the league. They reached the final of three cup competitions: the league cup, where they lost to North Ferriby United after extra time; the Staffordshire Senior Cup, where they lost to Kidsgrove Athletic; and the Walsall Senior Cup, which they retained. Rushall also equalled their best ever performance in the FA Cup, reaching the fourth qualifying round, where they were knocked out by Stourbridge.

In 2012–13, Rushall made their debut in the first round proper of the FA Trophy, having qualified with victories over Woodford United, Chasetown and Droylsden. Their reward was a trip to Wrexham, where they suffered a defeat against a team that went on to win the final of the competition. In the league, Rushall again were on the verge of the play-offs finishing in sixth position, but failed to make the end of season competition.

In 2013–14, Rushall Olympic made the fourth qualifying round of the FA Cup before losing out at Grimsby Town. Rushall eventually finished in seventh place in the league, narrowly missing out on the play-offs. However, there were two cup final appearances, as the Pics lost out in the final of the Walsall Senior Cup but won the Staffordshire Senior Cup, beating Port Vale 2–1 at Vale Park. At the end of the season, the club parted company with manager of five years Neil Kitching; his assistant, Nick Amos, also left the club. Rushall then appointed former West Bromwich Albion and Bolton Wanderers midfielder Richard Sneekes as manager, with Steve Hinks as his assistant.

Players

Current squad
 

The Southern Football League does not use a squad numbering system.

Management and coaching staff

Boardroom

Current staff

Honours
Northern Premier League Division One South
Play-off winners 2010–11
Midland Alliance
Champions 2004–05
West Midlands (Regional) League Division One
Champions 1979–80
Walsall Senior Cup
Winners 1964–65, 1999–2000, 2008–09, 2010–11, 2011–12
Staffordshire Senior Cup
Winners 2005–06, 2013–14, 2015–16

Club records
Best league performance: 6th in Northern Premier League, Premier Division (Step 3) 2012–13
Best FA Cup performance: Fourth Round Qualifying, 2007–08, 2011–12, 2013–14
Best FA Trophy performance: First Round Proper, 2012–13
Best FA Vase performance: Fifth round, 2000–01

See also
Rushall Olympic F.C. players
Rushall Olympic F.C. managers

Sources

References

External links

Official website

 
Football clubs in England
Northern Premier League clubs
Sport in Walsall
Southern Football League clubs
Football clubs in the West Midlands (county)
1893 establishments in England
Staffordshire County League (South)
Association football clubs established in 1893